Felipe de Oliveira Barros (born 5 August 1994) is a Brazilian football player who plays for Ríver Atlético Clube.

Playing career
Felipe played for J2 League club; Yokohama FC from 2014 to 2015.

References

External links

Felipe Barros at ZeroZero

1994 births
Sportspeople from Recife
Living people
Brazilian footballers
Brazilian expatriate footballers
Liga Portugal 2 players
J2 League players
Campeonato Brasileiro Série D players
Yokohama FC players
S.C. Farense players
C.D. Santa Clara players
Clube Atlético Penapolense players
Grêmio Novorizontino players
Batatais Futebol Clube players
River Atlético Clube players
Brazilian expatriate sportspeople in Japan
Brazilian expatriate sportspeople in Portugal
Expatriate footballers in Japan
Expatriate footballers in Portugal
Association football defenders